The 2013 Gracia–Orlová is the 27th edition of the Gracia–Orlová, a women's cycling stage race. It is an UCI 2.2 category race and is held between 24 and 28 April 2012 in the Czech Republic. It consists of a prologue and 5 stages.

Stages

Prologue
25 April 2012 – Havířov to Havířov (individual time trial), 
The prologue started in Havířov located in the east of the Republic, only 12 km from the Polish border and less than 40 km from Slovakia at 17:00 local time. Ellen van Dijk won the prologue, just as in the 2012 Gracia–Orlová. Behind Van Dijk her  teammate Lisa Brennauer finished second Aleksandra Burchenkova finished third. With Evelyn Stevens in fourth place made that 3  finished in the top 5.

Stage 1
25 April 2013 – Dětmarovice to Štramberk, 
The first stage started in Dětmarovice with a  travel south to Havířov. The riders swung east and encircled the lake to the south-east of the city. The course had during this section different small climbs, some steep but rising no more than 50m. At  and  started bigger climbs, but not that big as the mountains of stages 3 and 4. The race ended on top of a steep climb.

Due to the fall of the main bunch in the last three kilometer zone riders on place 1–101 were credited with the same time. The fall happened before beginning of the final climb. Evelyn Stevens won at the top of the climb the side-by-side sprint ahead of teammate Ellen van Dijk. Behind them Alena Amialiusik (BePink) finished third.

Stage 2
26 April 2012 – Havířov to Havířov (individual time trial), 
The second stage was a  individual time trial which took place in the morning starting from 9:30. The riders rode from Havířov to Ostrava and back. The time trial would have been two rounds but was shortened to one. The course has some humps witch sections reaching a gradients near 6% and had a sweeping bend at the turning point.

Stage 3
26 April 2013 – Orlová to Visalaje, 
The race sets out once again from Orlová in the afternoon on the same day as stage 2. This time the race began in the north of the town and heading north briefly before turning south-east towards the same lakes as in stage 1, then turns south at Stonava and south-west at Albrechtice. It passes the lakes Těrlicko and Žermanice before progressing south via Dobra and Nošovice. The first  had only a couple of small hills but from here the terrain begins to climb more steeply.

Stage 4
27 April 2012 – Lichnov to Lichnov, 

The fourth stage featured over the course of its  four main mountains. One reaching 1000m with a 6% gradient climb of 600m over 10 km to get there, one reaching 800m with a 5.3% climb of 425m in 8 km, one to 900m with another 6% climb over 4 km before it flattens out slightly over the last kilometre to the summit and a final climb to 550m with a 12.5% section over the last kilometer to the top. Then there was another very steep, short climb to the finish line.

The race started without team RusVelo.

Stage 5
28 April 2012 – Orlová to Orlová, 

Final classifications

General classification

Source

Points classification

Source

Mountains classification

Source

Sprints classification

Source

Team classification

Source

Classification leadership

References

External links

See also
 2013 in women's road cycling

2013 in women's road cycling
2013 in Czech sport
2013 in Polish sport
2013